Germantown High School (simply referred to as GHS or Germantown) is a public high school in Gluckstadt, Mississippi, United States (with a Madison postal address). It is part of the Madison County School District.

History 
The school's name Germantown comes from the history of German settlement in Gluckstadt, the community that it was built in.

Germantown High School is one of five public high schools in Madison County, Mississippi. The school was launched in August 2011 as part of the Madison County School District, one of the fastest-growing school districts in the state of Mississippi.

Curriculum 
The school offers a college-preparatory curriculum and includes teams for 18 varsity sports, varsity band and dance programs, and more than 20 school clubs. The school maintains a partnership with Holmes Community College in Ridgeland, Mississippi allowing academically qualified seniors to participate in a dual enrollment program, spending part of their day on each campus and taking college-level courses.

Athletics 
Germantown High School, with its teams named the "Mavericks," maintains 18 varsity sports. These include football, baseball, golf, soccer, track and field, cross-country, volleyball, tennis, swimming, bowling and their well known Band (Marching). The school also has programs in the less-common high school sports of powerlifting and team dance.

References

External links 
 

Schools in Madison County, Mississippi
Public high schools in Mississippi
Educational institutions established in 2011
2011 establishments in Mississippi